The "Colonel Bogey March" is a British march that was composed in 1914 by Lieutenant F. J. Ricketts (1881–1945) (pen name Kenneth J. Alford), a British Army bandmaster who later became the director of music for the Royal Marines at Plymouth. The march is often whistled. Featuring in films since it first appeared in The Bridge on the River Kwai in 1957, Empire magazine included the tune in its list of 25 of Cinema's Catchiest Earworms.

History

Since service personnel were, at that time, not encouraged to have professional lives outside the armed forces, British Army bandmaster F. J. Ricketts published "Colonel Bogey" and his other compositions under the pseudonym Kenneth J. Alford in 1914. One supposition is that the tune was inspired by a British military officer who "preferred to whistle a descending minor third" rather than shout "Fore!" when playing golf.  It is this descending interval that begins each line of the melody. The name "Colonel Bogey" began in the late 19th century as an imaginary "standard opponent" in assessing a player's performance, and by Edwardian times the Colonel had been adopted by the golfing world as the presiding spirit of the course. Edwardian golfers on both sides of the Atlantic often played matches against "Colonel Bogey". Bogey is now a golfing term meaning "one over par".

Legacy
The sheet music was a million-seller, and the march was recorded many times. At the start of World War II, "Colonel Bogey" became a British institution when a popular song  was set to the tune: "Hitler Has Only Got One Ball" (originally "Göring Has Only Got One Ball" after the Luftwaffe leader suffered a grievous groin injury), with the tune becoming an unofficial national anthem, essentially exalting rudeness. "Colonel Bogey" was used as a march-past by the 10th and 50th Battalions of the Canadian Expeditionary Force, the latter perpetuated today by The King's Own Calgary Regiment (RCAC) of the Canadian Forces, who claim "Colonel Bogey" as their authorised march-past in quick time.

The "Colonel Bogey March" melody was used for a song of the Women's Army Corps, a branch of the U.S. Army from 1943 until its absorption into the regular Army in 1978. The lyrics written by Major Dorothy E. Nielsen (USAR) were this: "Duty is calling you and me, we have a date with destiny, ready, the WACs are ready, their pulse is steady a world to set free. Service, we're in it heart and soul, victory is our only goal, we love our country's honor and we'll defend it against any foe."

In 1951, during the first computer conference held in Australia, the "Colonel Bogey March" was the first music played by a computer, by CSIRAC, a computer developed by the Commonwealth Scientific and Industrial Research Organisation.

In the 1961 film The Parent Trap, the campers at an all-girls summer camp whistle the "Colonel Bogey March" as they march through camp, mirroring the scene from The Bridge on the River Kwai.

In episode 28 (1976) of The Benny Hill Show, Sale of the Half-Century game show sketch, the march was used in a Name That Tune-style question. One of the contestants' answers was "After the Ball" after which the host (Benny) responded with, "well, you're sort of half-right" referring to the anti-Hitler slur.

The march has been used in German commercials for Underberg digestif bitter since the 1970s, and has become a classic jingle there. A parody titled "Comet" is a humorous song about the ill effects of consuming the cleaning product of the same name.

In the 1985 film The Breakfast Club, all the teenage main characters are whistling the tune during their Saturday detention when Principal Vernon (played by Paul Gleason) walks into the room. It was also used in Short Circuit and Spaceballs.

In the UK, the Colonel Bogey March is still (2019) one of the most common tunes played by ice-cream vans.

In the 2019, the Colonel Bogey March was used in the TV series The Man in the High Castle, in episode 8 of season 4.

The song was featured in episode 5 of season 6 of Outlander, revealing a returning character from season 5. The song also continued through the credits.

The Bridge on the River Kwai
English composer Malcolm Arnold added a counter-march, which he titled "The River Kwai March", for the 1957 dramatic film The Bridge on the River Kwai, set during World War II. The two marches were recorded together by Mitch Miller as "March from the River Kwai – Colonel Bogey" and it reached #20 in the US in 1958. 
The Arnold march forms part of the orchestral concert suite made of the Arnold film score by Christopher Palmer published by Novello & Co in London.

On account of the film, the "Colonel Bogey March" is often miscredited as the "River Kwai March". While Arnold did use "Colonel Bogey" in his score for the film, it was only the first theme and a bit of the second theme of "Colonel Bogey", whistled unaccompanied by the British prisoners several times as they marched into the prison camp. Since the film depicted prisoners of war held under inhumane conditions by the Japanese, Canadian officials were embarrassed in May 1980, when a military band played "Colonel Bogey" during a visit to Ottawa by Japanese prime minister Masayoshi Ōhira.  A British actor, Percy Herbert, who appeared in The Bridge on the River Kwai suggested the use of the song in the movie.  According to Kevin Brownlow’s interviews with David Lean, it was actually David Lean who knew of the song and fought during the screenwriting process to have it whistled by the troops. He realized it had to be whistled rather than sung because the lyrics were racy and would not get past the censors. Percy Herbert was used as a consultant on the film because he had first-hand experience of Japanese POW camps, he was paid an extra £5 per week by director David Lean.  However, he did not suggest the song.

Jewel Thief (1967) 
S.D. Burman used this composition in the 1967 Hindi spy thriller heist film Jewel Thief. The opening lines of "Yeh Dil Na Hota Bechaara" draw inspiration from the marching song.

Doctor Who
The science fiction series Doctor Who features the Colonel Bogey March whistled by Tom Baker as the fourth incarnation of the title character.

References

External links

1914 compositions
British military marches
Compositions for brass band
Compositions for symphony orchestra
Concert band pieces
Number-one singles in Germany
Songs about military officers
Songs about fictional male characters
Songs of World War I
Songs with music by Kenneth J. Alford
King's Own Calgary Regiment